ING Mexico was the Mexican subsidiary of the Dutch ING Group.

History
ING's initial operations in Mexico predate any involvement in the insurance arena by establishing a representative office of ING Barings in Mexico City where private and investment banking services in Mexico were offered to high-net-worth individuals and large corporations. However, ING's funding of Mexican ventures in the international arena was done directly from their New York City, London, Switzerland and Amsterdam offices.
 
ING Mexico's operations today are largely composed of its acquisition of Seguros Comercial America. Seguros Comercial America (now Seguros ING) is Mexico's largest insurance company that results from the acquisition and reverse merger of Seguros America (once owned by Banamex, Mexico's largest commercial bank), and Seguros La Comercial under the management of its previous majority stockholder, Alfonso Romo Garza, who also acquired ASEMEX, a former state-owned underwriter that was the largest insurance company still held by the Mexican government under President Ernesto Zedillo's term, that is also part of the Seguros Comercial America legacy.

Banks of Mexico
ING Group